Martin Borisov Dimitrov (born 7 July 1987) is a Bulgarian football midfielder who is currently a free agent after most recently being under contract with Lokomotiv 1929 Sofia.

References

External links
 

1987 births
Living people
Bulgarian footballers
FC Pomorie players
FC Lokomotiv 1929 Sofia players
PFC Marek Dupnitsa players
FC Septemvri Sofia players
Association football midfielders
First Professional Football League (Bulgaria) players